Pendle Hill is a suburb of Sydney, in the state of New South Wales, Australia. Pendle Hill is located 29 kilometres west of the Sydney central business district, in the local government areas of Cumberland Council and City of Parramatta and is part of the Greater Western Sydney region.

History
George Bond (1876–1950), an American who came to Australia in 1909, established a cotton spinning mill in the area in 1923. It was Australia's first attempt to spin and weave cotton from cotton farms that the company owned in Queensland. Lancashire was the centre of England's cotton industry, and Pendle Hill is a hill in the heart of the Lancashire cotton industry. It seems likely this is where the town gained its name. George Bond was originally in the business of importing hosiery and underwear but during World War I began manufacturing hosiery in Redfern and by 1925 was producing a quarter of Australia's output of hosiery and knitted garments. Bond Industries Limited became a public company in 1927.

The railway station at Pendle Hill opened here on 12 April 1924. The first government school opened in 1955 and the first post office was opened in 1956 by Postmaster Sqn. Ldr.[Rtd] Richard R. Purdie M.B.E. and his wife Elsie. Nearby "Purdie Lane" is named after these long time pioneers of Pendle Hill.

Commercial area
Pendle Hill has a large shopping centre with just over 50 specialty shops beside the railway station. It contains many supermarket, discount stores, grocery shops, specialty shops, real-estate agent, bank, and cafes, fish markets and butchers.

Transport
Pendle Hill railway station is on the North Shore & Western Line of the Sydney Trains network.

Schools
 Pendle Hill Public School is a primary school
 Pendle Hill High School is a secondary school

Parks
Civic Park is a large park located just west of the railway station. It connects the shopping centre to the suburb of Girraween, and is frequently used as a thoroughfare for pedestrians heading to and from the railway station. Civic Park now contains two tennis courts and a half court basketball facility.

Binalong Park (also known as Binalong Oval) is a large oval in the north of Pendle Hill bordering Toongabbie. The park contains two tennis courts, four netball courts and four ovals. These both are particularly popular for sporting lessons, and weekend sporting events. The grounds are home to the Pendle Hill Tigers football club  who compete in the Granville district Football Association and Pendle Hill Colts Cricket Club, who compete in the Parramatta District Cricket association, competitions at both junior and senior level. The netball courts are the training venue for Pendle Hill Netball Club Inc., who compete in the Blacktown City Netball Association competitions at junior and senior level.

References

Suburbs of Sydney
Cumberland Council, New South Wales
City of Parramatta
Little Indias